Nick Thurston (born December 7, 1987) is an American actor, born and raised in the San Francisco Bay area of California. A college graduate, Thurston attended several schools, including the American Conservatory Theater, as well as the British American Drama Academy located in London. Thurston finally graduated with a Bachelor's degree in acting from the University of Southern California. Since graduating, Thurston has become an active member in the acting community, starring in several films including Reviving Ophelia, White Irish Drinkers, Not for Human Consumption, and a notable appearance as Blue Eyes, who is considered to be the secondary ape protagonist in Dawn of the Planet of the Apes. Nick has also acted on the set of several TV shows including Ghost Whisperer, Cold Case, and The Truth Below on well-known TV broadcasting stations including CBS and MTV. Thurston has also appeared in The Lake, an online TV series created by Warner Bros. Entertainment Inc.

Career

Dawn of the Planet of the Apes

Thurston portrays Blue Eyes in Dawn of the Planet of the Apes. Here, Thurston plays the role of a young, rebellious, and stubborn ape. This is Thurston’s first experience with a blockbuster movie, as all of his prior experience was with small scale, low budget indie productions.

White Irish Drinkers
Thurston plays the role of Brian Leary, the primary protagonist in White Irish Drinkers. Here Thurston plays an artistic young man, who is misunderstood and underappreciated by his family and friends, who find themselves content with labor intensive work, and have no aptitude to go on to higher education. Brian, surrounded by a dreary reality, finds an escape in his art. This escape allows Brian to avoid the life of crime his brother has chosen, and to block out the problems that life has presented to him. "The Observer describes Brian as 'a boy with a conscience who turns the basement room under the bagel shop in his parents’ building into a secret art studio, where he creates impressionistic charcoal drawings and watercolor sketches of the city around him, donning headphones to drown out the noise and shouting between his parents.'"

Not for Human Consumption
In a film inspired by true events, Nick Thurston Stars as Jay Trotta, a witty, young ex-drug abuser who has just been liberated from prison. Now sober, Jay plans to make his way in the world in a respectable way, staying away from the drugs that landed him in prison. Eventually, after a good deal of time and hard work, Jay becomes the partial owner of a newly founded hookah bar. Eventually, Jay's past catches up with him, and he gets involved with the selling of a new drug disguised as incense, avoiding legal trouble by labeling the drug as "not for human consumption".

Television appearances

Grimm
Thurston played violinist prodigy Roddy Geiger in the 5th episode of the first season of Grimm.

Ghost Whisperer
Thurston makes a guest appearance as a Varsity Football player in the premiere of season five of Ghost Whisperer, though his role on the show was never permanent.

Cold Case
Thurston stars as Nash Simpson, a guest role in "Hood Rats", an episode from the second episode of the seventh season of Cold Case.

Personal life
Thurston currently lives in Los Angeles, California.

Filmography

Film

Video games

Awards 
Nick Thurston received the best actor award for his performance in Primrose at the Hollyshorts film festival in 2015.

References

External links

American male film actors
American male television actors
American male voice actors
People from California
USC School of Dramatic Arts alumni
Living people
1987 births